The Garden City Classic was a golf tournament held in New Zealand from 1969 to 1975. The event was hosted by Russley Golf Club in Christchurch. Russley hosted the New Zealand Airlines Classic in 1976.

History 
The event was part of the PGA of New Zealand circuit. John Lister won the event in four successive years, from 1972 to 1975.

Winners

References

Golf tournaments in New Zealand
Recurring sporting events established in 1969
Recurring sporting events disestablished in 1975
1969 establishments in New Zealand
1975 disestablishments in New Zealand